Taliepus is a genus of kelp and spider crabs in the family Epialtidae. There are at least three described species in the genus Taliepus.

Species
These three species belong to the genus Taliepus:
 Taliepus dentatus (H. Milne Edwards, 1834) c g
 Taliepus marginatus (Bell, 1835) c g
 Taliepus nuttallii (J. W. Randall, 1840) i c g b (southern kelp crab)
Data sources: i = ITIS, c = Catalogue of Life, g = GBIF, b = Bugguide.net

References

Further reading

 

Decapods
Articles created by Qbugbot